The Twin Sisters Lookout, also known as the Twin Sisters Radio Tower and the Twin Sisters Shelter Cabin, was built by the U.S. Forest Service in 1914, the year before the establishment of Rocky Mountain National Park. The rustic stone structure was taken over by the National Park Service in 1925. The one-story building has an arched roof with a trap door to provide access when snow has drifted over the ground-level door. From 1914 to 1969 the shelter served as accommodations for fire observation crews at a nearby frame lookout, which has since vanished. The building is now used as a radio repeater station.

See also
National Register of Historic Places listings in Larimer County, Colorado

References

External links

 at the National Park Service's NRHP database

Park buildings and structures on the National Register of Historic Places in Colorado
Government buildings completed in 1914
National Register of Historic Places in Rocky Mountain National Park
Geography of Larimer County, Colorado
Rustic architecture in Colorado
National Register of Historic Places in Larimer County, Colorado
1914 establishments in Colorado
Roosevelt National Forest